{{Infobox television
| image        = Rude_Tube_Title_Screen_2017.png
| caption      = Rude Tube Title Card, 2017
| alt_name     = Rude(ish) Tube (pre-watershed edition)'
| genre        = Clip show
| opentheme    = "Trash" by The Whip
| presenter    = Alex ZaneMatt Kirshen (2008)
| country      = United Kingdom
| num_series   = 11 + Specials
| num_episodes = 99
| network      = Channel 4 (2008–2015)E4 (2008–2017)
| first_aired  = 
| last_aired   = 
}}Rude Tube is a British television programme broadcast on Channel 4 and its sister channel E4. Most of the programme's episodes have been presented by British comedian Alex Zane, who launched the show's pilot episode in February 2008. Comedian Matt Kirshen presented the show's first full series in 2008 on E4. Zane has hosted the show since its 2009 New Year special. Johnny Vegas and Emma Frain have also featured in multiple sketches between clips on episodes hosted by Alex Zane. The pilot episode in February 2008 was followed by a first series which aired November to December of that year. A Christmas episode followed the series. A New Year episode was broadcast January 3, 2009. A second series aired across October 2009.

The eleventh and final series debuted on E4 on Tuesday 16 May 2017 with an episode entitled "Animals Assemble". The programme had its last episode on 18 July 2017 but is unknown if a new series will take place

FormatRude Tube is a clip show with the majority of episodes formatted as a run-down of the 'top internet viral videos', usually with either 100 or 50 clips per episode although the first series presented by Matt Kirshen only had 20 clips per half-hour episode. Episodes are usually interspersed with interview clips of the viral videos' creators and stars.

Most episodes of Rude Tube are themed, with titles to date including Epic Fails, Rude Tunes, Utter Pranks, Extreme Rides, Daft Stunts, Rude 'lympics, Kick-Ass Animals and Gods of Geek. A New Year special episodes have been broadcast in early January from 2009 to 2015. Christmas special episodes were broadcast in December 2011, 2012, 2013, 2014 and 2015.

A 20-episode spin-off series, Rude(ish) Tube, was first shown on E4 in 2012 and then received an additional series.

 Broadcast history 

Pilot (Channel 4)
Rude Tube was first broadcast on Channel 4 as a pilot episode on 6 February 2008, presented by Alex Zane. The pilot attracted 2.5 million viewers, aired in a Friday primetime slot, with a 10.8% share of UK TV viewers.

Series 1 (E4)
A full series followed later in the year. It was presented by Matt Kirshen and broadcast on Channel 4's free-to-view digital channel E4. The 6-episode series aired from November to December 2008.

Series 2–7 and Specials (Channel 4)
A special episode entitled Rude Tube 2009 was broadcast on Channel 4 on 2 January 2009, with Alex Zane returning as host. Zane would remain the show's main host for all future Channel 4 episodes. Rude Tube 2009 featured the 'top 50 viral video clips on the web' as rated by number of views in 2008. The series was followed by a New Year special, broadcast on 2 January 2009.

A second series, known as Rude Tube III was broadcast on Channel 4 in October 2009 and featured three new 60-minute episodes. The series was followed by the second New Year special, broadcast on 3 January 2010.

A third series, Rude Tube IV commenced in October 2010 and ran for 6 episodes, followed by the third New Year special, broadcast on 7 January 2011. The special episode featured 100 clips, which were a combination of 50 highlights from Rude Tube IV and 50 new clips.

A fourth full series of the show featured eight new episodes and aired on Channel 4 from September to November 2011. This was followed by the first Rude Tube Christmas special – a countdown of 50 Christmas themed clips which aired on Christmas Day at 10pm on Channel 4. The Christmas special was followed by the fourth New Year special, broadcast on 6 January 2012.

A new series of six episodes began in September 2012, with the show's second Christmas special and fifth New Year special splitting the series, which concluded in early 2013. A further 15 episodes were broadcast in 2013, concluding with the third Christmas special on 27 December. A sixth New Year special followed on 3 January 2014. Comedian Johnny Vegas guest starred with Zane as the voice of the 'talking computer' on some of the 2012 and 2013 episodes.

Rude(ish) Tube (E4)
Known as 'Rude Tube's little sister', Rude(ish) Tube is a spin-off series featuring clips described as 'very cheeky – if a bit less rude'. The series is broadcast on E4.

Series 8, Specials and move to E4
Rude Tube returned for its eighth series in November 2014. Presented by Alex Zane, the main series premiered on E4 for the first time since series one. Series eight ran from 11 November to 30 December and consisted of eight individually-themed episodes. In addition, two special programmes, Rude Tube Christmas Cracker 2014 and Welcome to 2015 were shown on Channel 4 on 25 December 2014 and 1 January 2015 respectively.

Series 9 and Specials
The ninth series of Rude Tube debuted on Sunday 2 August 2015 on E4 with an episode entitled 200% Cats – it ran for ten episodes with Zane returning as host. The series was followed by the regular Christmas and New Year specials, broadcast on Channel 4 on 25 December 2015 and 1 January 2016 respectively.

Series 10 and Specials
The tenth series debuted on E4 on Monday 11 January 2016 with an episode entitled "Daredevils & Dummies". Rude Tube Christmas Cracker 2016 and Welcome To 2017 aired on Channel 4 on 24 and 30 December respectively.

Series 11
The eleventh series debuted on E4 on Tuesday 16 May 2017 with an episode entitled "Animals Assemble".

Episode guide

ReleasesAlex Zane presents The Best of Rude Tube (2011, DVD, 158 minutes, Acorn Media)

International distribution
The show airs in the United States on the Fusion cable & satellite channel.

See alsoRobert's Web – a similar television seriesTotally Viral'' – a similar television series

References

External links
Twitter site
E4 site

2008 British television series debuts
2017 British television series endings
2000s British comedy television series
2010s British comedy television series
Channel 4 comedy
Clip shows
English-language television shows
E4 comedy
Fusion TV original programming
Video clip television series